Aagaah: The Warning is a Hindi drama Horror film directed by Karan Razdan and produced by Ram Kudale. The film was released on 5 August 2011.

Plot
The movie starts with the scenario of a terrorist training camp where the group leader Aaazan Khan preparing his team for a mission of terrorist attack in Mumbai. The group took over a boat to encroach Mumbai from the seas as like 26/11 attack. They killed Boatman Ramsharan and his fellow fishermen in this course. On reaching the shores, Azaan is shot down by police but attack continues as planned by them.

In a far away seaside village, Ramsharan's family is shocked on hearing about his death. His parents and wife Megha tries to console their only child Muskan. Muskan eagerly wait for her father because she does not understand the concept of death. Muskaan is always in search for her father. During her search she gets possessed by a spirit who tries to converse with the family. Local villagers informs the police about the ghost attack on the family and a corrupt police officer arrests Megha. While police officer tries to molest her the spirit re appears and beat him. Pir Baba come to help Muskan and the family but the spirit is still is there. On the other hand, a rich businessman Nawab saab involves with the terrorist who planned to attack the village. Spirit informs Ramsharan's family regarding the future attack. While para military forces come there and estopped them the spirit appears again and disclose that he is the ghost of deceased Aazan Khan who realised after death that Zihaad or revolution is not killing innocent people but to follow the path of peace as prescribed by the Quran.

Cast

References

External links
 

2011 films
2010s Hindi-language films
Indian horror drama films
2011 horror films